Jack Whittle (10 January 1890 – 20 July 1973) was an  Australian rules footballer who played with St Kilda in the Victorian Football League (VFL).

Notes

External links 

Jack Whittle's playing statistics from The VFA Project

1890 births
1973 deaths
Australian rules footballers from Victoria (Australia)
St Kilda Football Club players
Essendon Association Football Club players